As a nickname, Hap or Haps is commonly short for Henry, Harry, Harold, or Harrison. It may refer to:

People with the nicknamed 

 Henry H. Arnold (1886–1950), American General of the Army and General of the Air Force
 Hap Collard (1898–1968), American Major League Baseball (MLB) pitcher
 Hap Day (1901–1990), Canadian National Hockey League (NHL) Hall of Fame player, coach, and general manager 
 Hap Emms (1905–1988), Canadian NHL player, coach, general manager, and team owner
 Hap Farber (born 1948), American National Football League (NFL) player
 Harrison Farber, American professor of medicine and Director of the Pulmonary Hypertension Center at Boston University
 Frank S. Farley (1901–1977), American politician and New Jersey State Senator 
 Hobart R. Gay (1894–1983), US Army lieutenant general
 Hap Hadley (1895–1976), American artist specializing in pen and ink representations
 Hap Holmes (1892–1941), Canadian NHL goaltender
 Emil Huhn (1892–1925), American MLB player
 B. Kliban (1935–1990), American cartoonist
 Louis Kuehn (1901–1981), American diver and 1920 Olympic gold medalist
 Harry McSween (born 1945), Professor of Planetary Geoscience and Distinguished Professor of Science at the University of Tennessee at Knoxville
 Hap Marre, American soccer player of the 1910s
 Herb Mitchell (ice hockey) (1895–1969), Canadian NHL player
 Hap Moran (1901–1994), American NFL halfback
 Hap Myers (1887–1967), American MLB player
 Hap Myers (ice hockey) (born 1947), Canadian NHL player 
 Hap Palmer (born 1942), American children's musician
 Harold Ridley (Jesuit) (1939–2005), Roman Catholic priest and President of Loyola College in Maryland
 Hap Sharp (1928–1993), American race car driver
 Hap Spuhler (1918–1982), American college head baseball coach and athletic director
 Hap Ward (1885–1979), who played one game in the MLB when the Detroit Tigers went on strike

Fictional characters with the nickname 

 Hap Eckhart, in Christopher Nolan's 2002 film Insomnia, played by Martin Donovan
 Harry "Hap" Loman, in Arthur Miller's play Death of a Salesman
 Hap, in the 1989 film Always, played by Audrey Hepburn
 Hap Collins, in novels and stories by Joe R. Lansdale – see Hap and Leonard
 Hap Shaughnessy on the Canadian TV comedy series The Red Green Show
 Hap Smith, in the 1952 film Jumping Jacks, played by Jerry Lewis
 Harlan "Hap" Briggs, played by actor Don Johnson on the ABC prime time television drama series Blood & Oil
 Leslie "Hap" Hapablap, an Air Force colonel in The Simpsons, voiced by R. Lee Ermey
 Dr. Hunter "Hap" Aloysius Percy, the antagonist in The OA, played by Jason Isaacs

See also 

 Happy (nickname)
 Haps (disambiguation)
 HAP (disambiguation)

Lists of people by nickname